KCLB-FM (93.7 MHz) is a commercial radio station in Coachella, California, broadcasting to the Palm Springs, California, radio market.  It airs a mainstream rock radio format.  KCLB is owned by Alpha Media LLC, through licensee Alpha Media Licensee LLC Debtor in Possession.  Programming is simulcast on sister station 95.5 KCLZ in Twentynine Palms Base, about 30 miles to the north of Coachella.

KCLB's studio and offices are on North Gene Autry Trail in Palm Springs.  The transmitter is located in Indio Hills, California.  Its signal reaches as far west as Beaumont and far east as Desert Center and as far south as the Imperial Valley.

History

Early years
On September 1, 1960, the station signed on the air as KCHV-FM.  It was owned by the Coachella Valley Broadcasting Company and it simulcast co-owned AM 970 KCHV (now KNWZ).  The two stations mixed middle of the road music, news and talk.  By the late 1960s, KCHV-FM was separately programmed with an automated country music format.

In 1972, in response to the growing Mexican-American community in the Coachella Valley, the station switched to a Regional Mexican music format, with the new call sign KVIM.

Starting in 1974, both KCHV and KVIM changed their programming late nights to play progressive rock from 10pm to 6am.  Scott Roberts, later with KKRZ Z-100 in Portland, Oregon, worked the late night shift at KCHV/KVIM and was the first disc jockey to play a free form rock format in the Coachella Valley.  Roberts left KCHV/KVIM in 1976.

In 1983, the AM and FM stations switched formats.  AM 970 became Spanish-language KVIM, playing Regional Mexican music.  FM 93.7 returned to KCHV-FM, airing middle of the road music, talk and news by day, and album rock at night.

Album rock
The station began calling itself The Rock and airing a more structured Album Rock (AOR) format in 1985, based on playing the biggest selling rock artists.  Program Director Cyrene Jagger was able to get KCHV-FM recognized as a reporting station for Radio & Records and FMQB radio industry magazines.  She developed a complete rock music library and began coordinating live concerts and invited rock artists visiting the Coachella Valley to come on the air. Jagger remained as Program Director until 1989.

For six months in 1988, KCHV-FM had a brief call sign change to KRCK (standing for the word "Rock").  But the Federal Communications Commission (FCC) failed to recognize those call letters were already claimed by another radio station, so 93.7 returned to KCHV-FM.

KCHV-FM achieved some of its biggest success under Operations Manager Bill Todd from 1989 to 1991.  Todd, who had worked at such stations as WIBG, Philadelphia; WRKO, Boston; KHJ, and KMET, Los Angeles; built up KCHV-FM into a major album rock station in Southern California. Russell J. and Cyrene Jagger hosted mornings, Jim King in middays, John O. in afternoons with nights handled by Jimi "The Hitman" Hurley, Shawn The Trogg and Mitch Michaels (Jim Black).  Other notable contributors of the time were Rhonda Todd (Music Director), Bobby Blue, Don James, DJ Martin, Satch Miata, Angela Nixs, Michael Parks, Brian Ross, Shana, Guy Smith, Igor Smith, Jackson T, Jill West, Christy Wild, and Kate Willis.

Switch to KCLB-FM
In 1991, Bill Todd departed and the station switched its call letters to KCLB-FM.  In the mid- and late-1990s, KCLB called itself "The Valley's Best Rock."  Its program director was J.J. Jeffries; he was replaced by music director Ron Stryker, who guided the station the top of the Coachella Valley ratings.  Disc jockeys during this time included Jeffries and Stryker, Katie Brock, John O, Tony Montana, Jon Pergl, Bill Royal, Christian Stiehler, Jeff Duran, Steve Inman, Steve Santogrossi ("The Night Manager") and Liz West. 

Between 2003 and 2005 former Anchorage personality Rick Sparks worked with Operations Manager Gary DeMaroney and consultant Greg Ausham to give the station a more modern sound. Sparks was moved to the radio group's flailing Eagle station in an attempt to fix its shortcomings but Rick soon left broadcasting due to the toxic & unreliable nature of the group's operations. Antdog (also PD of rhythmic contemporary 92.7 KKUU) took over as KCLB-FM's Program Director in 2005 and gave the station a harder edge with antiquated hair metal which performed very poorly with the Palm Springs/Coachella valley listening audience.

In June 1994, KCLB-FM aired a one-hour comedy segment titled "Men Are Scum."  Female callers described men in humorous yet controversial ways and the segment made national headlines. 

In 1998, KCLB-FM and AM 970 were bought by Morris Communications for $7 million.  The AM station switched to a Spanish Contemporary format, taking the call letters KCLB.  Several years later, it moved to an English-language News/Talk format as KNWZ.

In 2014, Alpha Media, based in Portland, Oregon, acquired a number of Palm Springs-area radio stations, including KCLB-FM and KNWZ, as well as 1140 KNWQ, 1270 KFSQ, 92.7 KKUU and 95.5 KCLZ.

References

External links
Official website

Mainstream rock radio stations in the United States
CLB-FM
Mass media in Riverside County, California
Coachella, California
Radio stations established in 1960
1960 establishments in California
Alpha Media radio stations